The 1972 NBA playoffs was the postseason tournament of the National Basketball Association's 1971–72 season. The tournament concluded with the Western Conference champion Los Angeles Lakers defeating the Eastern Conference champion New York Knicks 4 games to 1 in the NBA Finals. Wilt Chamberlain was named NBA Finals MVP.

The Lakers finished the regular season with the best record in NBA history at 69–13, a mark that was unequalled until the 1996 Bulls finished 72–10. Led by Chamberlain and Jerry West, the Lakers won their first title in Los Angeles; their last title was in 1954 as the Minneapolis Lakers.

The Lakers won their first NBA Finals in their last nine appearances without superstar Elgin Baylor, who had played in each of the preceding eight losses. He retired nine games into the season because of ongoing knee problems.

The Conference Semifinals series between the Bullets and Knicks would be the last NBA playoff series in which the team with the inferior regular season record held home-court advantage based on division champions holding home-court advantage over a division runner-up through the Conference Finals. Although from 1977–2015, division champions were either automatically seeded higher than non-division champions or guaranteed a minimum seed regardless of record. However, home-court advantage would be based on regular season record, with division champion status being used as a possible tiebreaker to determine seeding.

Bracket

Conference semifinals

Eastern Conference semifinals

(A1) Boston Celtics vs. (C2) Atlanta Hawks

This was the fifth playoff meeting between these two teams, with the Celtics winning three of the four meetings while the Hawks were based in St. Louis.

(C1) Baltimore Bullets vs. (A2) New York Knicks

This was the fourth playoff meeting between these two teams, with the Knicks winning two of the previous three meetings.

Western Conference semifinals

(P1) Los Angeles Lakers vs. (M2) Chicago Bulls

This was the third playoff meeting between these two teams, with the Lakers winning both prior meetings.

(M1) Milwaukee Bucks vs. (P2) Golden State Warriors

This was the second playoff meeting between these two teams, with the Bucks winning the first meeting.

Conference finals

Eastern Conference finals

(A1) Boston Celtics vs. (A2) New York Knicks

This was the eighth playoff meeting between these two teams, with the Celtics winning four of the first seven meetings.

Western Conference finals

(P1) Los Angeles Lakers vs. (M1) Milwaukee Bucks

 Kareem Abdul-Jabbar's famous dunk on Wilt Chamberlain.

 Happy Hairston hits the game-winning basket with 6 seconds left.

This was the second playoff meeting between these two teams, with the Bucks winning the first meeting.

NBA Finals: (P1) Los Angeles Lakers vs. (A2) New York Knicks

 Walt Frazier tips in a Dave DeBusschere miss over Wilt Chamberlain with 3 seconds left in regulation to force OT.

 The Lakers win their first title after moving to Los Angeles.

This was the fourth playoff meeting between these two teams, with the Lakers winning two of the first three meetings.

See also
1972 NBA Finals
1971–72 NBA season
1971–72 Los Angeles Lakers season

References

External links
Sports Illustrated (April 24, 1972) Los Angeles Scrambles Back
Basketball-Reference.com's 1972 NBA Playoffs page

National Basketball Association playoffs
Playoffs

fi:NBA-kausi 1971–1972#Pudotuspelit